Red Princesses is a 2013 Costa Rican drama film directed by Laura Astorga. It was selected as the Costa Rican entry for the Best Foreign Language Film at the 87th Academy Awards, but was not nominated. The film tells the story of the daughters of Sandinista revolutionaries who flee to neighboring Costa Rica.

Cast
 Fernando Bolaños as Felipe
 María José Callejas as Floria
 Valeria Conejo as Claudia
 Aura Dinarte as Antonia
 Ivette Guier as Cora

See also
 List of submissions to the 87th Academy Awards for Best Foreign Language Film
 List of Costa Rican submissions for the Academy Award for Best Foreign Language Film

References

External links
 

2013 films
2013 drama films
Costa Rican drama films
2010s Spanish-language films